Pahari Sanyal (22 February 1906 – 10 February 1974) was an Indian actor and singer who is known for his work in Bengali cinema.

Sanyal acted in many Bengali films, such as Harano Sur, Bhanu Goenda Jahar Assistant, and Shilpi. Besides being a character actor, Sanyal gave a lead performance in his portrayal of Bengali reformer Vidyasagar and of the poet, playwright/dramatist and actor Girishchandra Ghosh in "Mahakabi Girishchandra". He played the small role of an ornithologist in Satyajit Ray's Kanchenjungha and later a character role in " Aranyaer Din Ratri ". He was seen in some Hindi films such as the Raj Kapoor vehicle Jagte Raho, the double version "Aradhana" directed by Sakti Samanta and English films such as the Merchant-Ivory venture The Householder.

Selected filmography

References

External links

1906 births
1974 deaths
Bengali male actors
University of Calcutta alumni
20th-century Indian male actors
Male actors in Hindi cinema
People from Darjeeling
Male actors from West Bengal
Male actors in Bengali cinema